Chinese migrant may refer to:

Migration in China
Overseas Chinese